Braulio Uraezaña Cuñaendi (born March 26, 1995, in Bolivia) is a Bolivian  footballer who currently plays goalkeeper for Blooming.

Club career statistics

International career
Uraezaña was summoned to the Bolivian U-20 team to play in the 2015 South American Youth Football Championship.

References

External links
 
 Braulio Uraezaña at ZeroZero

1995 births
Living people
Bolivian footballers
Association football goalkeepers
Club Blooming players
Club Real Potosí players
Guabirá players
Bolivian Primera División players